Area code 513 is a telephone area code in the North American Numbering Plan (NANP) for the southwest of the U.S. state of Ohio, including Cincinnati and surrounding cities, such as Forest Park, Hamilton, Lebanon, West Chester, Mason, Maineville, Middletown, Milford, Norwood, Oxford, Harrison, Cleves, Miamitown and Trenton.

History

The first nationwide telephone numbering plan of 1947 divided Ohio into four numbering plan areas (NPAs), forming a quadrant layout for telecommunication services in the state. AT&T assigned area code 513 to the southwestern quadrant, which included Cincinnati and Dayton.

Due to the proliferation of cell phones and pagers in the 1990s, the numbering plan area had to be split in 1996 to provide more central office prefixes and telephone numbers. The eastern and northern portions, including Dayton, received area code 937. This made 513 largely coextensive with the Cincinnati metropolitan area, though a few outer eastern suburbs transferred to 937.

In 2000, area code 283 was reserved for numbering plan area 513 to create an overlay plan. Although permissive dialing began on January 15, 2001, the implementation was suspended, because of the economic downturn and the return of telephone numbers as a result of the abandonment of service by competitive local telephone companies.  Projections showed no need for an overlay code in Cincinnati until at least 2023.

Prior to October 2021, area code 513 had telephone numbers assigned for the central office code 988. In 2020, 988 was designated nationwide as a dialing code for the National Suicide Prevention Lifeline, which created a conflict for exchanges that permit seven-digit dialing. This area code, along with the neighboring area code 859, therefore transitioned to ten-digit dialing on October 24, 2021.

NANP projections indicated exhaustion of central office prefixes in 513 by the fourth quarter of 2023. For relief, on December 15, 2021, the Public Utilities Commission of Ohio approved an all-service overlay plan for the numbering plan area with the new area code 283, scheduled for operation on April 28, 2023.

References

External links

513
513
Telecommunications-related introductions in 1947